515 Alive Music Festival was a multi-day music and camping festival in Des Moines, Iowa. The festival features mostly EDM with a small selection of hip-hop music. In 2017, the event attracted over 25,000 people. It has expanded almost every year since its creation. It is the largest such event in the state of Iowa.

References

External links
 Official Site 

Music festivals in Iowa